The Sherwood Consort is an American early music group founded in 1995 in Berkeley, California, and specialized in medieval music, particularly of England. The director is Mary Devlin. The vocal director and vocal coach for several of their recordings was Renée Fladen-Kamm.

Discography

Between March & April (1997)

Robin Loves Me (1998)

One Day as I Went Riding (2002)

References

Early music groups
Musical groups from Berkeley, California
1995 establishments in California